Košarkarski klub Lastovka, commonly referred to as KK Lastovka or simply Lastovka, is a Slovenian basketball club based in Domžale. The club was founded in 1997. In the summer of 2016 the senior team merged with KOŠ Koper to form KK Primorska. The club currently competes only with youth selections.

Honours
Cup
Slovenian Cup:
Runners-up: 2016

References

External links
Official website 
Eurobasket.com Team Profile

Basketball teams established in 1997
Basketball teams in Slovenia
1997 establishments in Slovenia